Kobita Jugnauth (née Ramdanee) is the wife of Pravind Jugnauth, the leader of the Militant Socialist Movement (MSM) and current Prime Minister of Mauritius.

It is the second time that she is holding the title of Spouse of the Prime Minister of Mauritius given that her husband has held the office of Prime Minister twice, first from 2017 to 2019 and again from 2019 to now.

Early life
Kobita is the daughter of Ursule Jeannine Maunick and Sir Kailash Ramdanee. Sir Kailash Ramdanee founded the Mauritius Pharmaceuticals Manufacturing Co. Ltd which pioneered the manufacture of medicines in Mauritius.
Kobita completed her secondary education at Queen Elizabeth College, Mauritius.

Kobita Ramdanee married Pravind Jugnauth in 1992. They have three daughters: Sonika (born 1994), Sonali (born 1996) and Sara.

See also

 Spouse of the prime minister of Mauritius

References

Living people
Spouses of prime ministers of Mauritius
Mauritian people of Indian descent
Year of birth missing (living people)